Jeparit is a town on the Wimmera River in Western Victoria, Australia,  north west of Melbourne. At the 2016 census Jeparit had a population of 342, down from 394 five years earlier.

History
The area around Jeparit is originally home to the Gromiluk Aboriginal peoples prior to European settlement.  The name Jeparit is believed to be derived from a Gromiluk word meaning "home of small birds".  European settlement began in the 1880s when German Lutheran immigrants began to settle and grow wheat.

The town was surveyed in 1883 and gazetted in 1889, the post office opening on 31 August 1889  though known as Lake Hindmarsh until December 1889. Two earlier post offices called Lake Hindmarsh had existed in the area at various times since 1861 to serve a smaller population of graziers.

Jeparit's most famous son is former Australian Prime Minister and founder of the Liberal Party, Sir Robert Menzies, who was born in the town in 1894.  He is commemorated with a spire and a memorial bust installed at the town square. The spire, topped with an ornament resembling a Scottish Thistle, is inscribed:

Sport
With its neighbouring township, Rainbow, Jeparit has a football team (Jeparit-Rainbow) competing in the Horsham & District Football League.

Golfers play at the course of the Jeparit Golf Club on Nhill Road.

Jeparit is the setting for Peter Carey's 1985 novel Illywhacker.

References

External links

Further information about Jeparit and surrounding areas
Wimmera-Mallee Pioneer Museum
Lake Hindmarsh

Towns in Victoria (Australia)
Wimmera